Marion L. Steele High School, often referred to as Amherst Steele, is a public high school located in Amherst, Ohio, United States, approximately  west of Cleveland. The school is named after a long serving principal of Amherst High, Marion L. Steele.

Student life
The school colors are Kelly green and gold and the athletic teams are nicknamed the Comets. The school is a member of the Southwestern Conference.

State championships

 Boys' cross country – 1962, 1977
 Girls' cross country – 1991

References

External links

High schools in Lorain County, Ohio
Public high schools in Ohio